
Restaurant Het Koetshuis is a restaurant located in Bennekom, in the Netherlands. It is a fine dining restaurant that was awarded one Michelin star in the period 1998–present.

Gault Millau awarded the restaurant 16 out of 20 points.

Owner and head chef of Het Koetshuis is Wicher Löhr. In 1986 Wicher and his wife Saskia took over the restaurant.

Het Koetshuis is a member of Alliance Gastronomique Néerlandaise.

See also
List of Michelin starred restaurants in the Netherlands

References

External links
 Photo of the restaurant

Restaurants in the Netherlands
Michelin Guide starred restaurants in the Netherlands
Het Koetshuis
Het Koetshuis